Tony Walker, nicknamed "Pretty Boy", was an American Negro league pitcher in the 1940s.

Walker made his Negro leagues debut in 1944 with the Baltimore Elite Giants. The following season, he returned to Baltimore and also played for the Philadelphia Stars.

References

External links
 and Seamheads

Year of birth missing
Year of death missing
Place of birth missing
Place of death missing
Baltimore Elite Giants players
Philadelphia Stars players
Baseball pitchers